Michel "Mitch" Dorge (born September 15, 1960) is a Canadian drummer, multi-instrumentalist, composer and record producer. He has been the drummer with Crash Test Dummies since 1991, and has produced albums with the band, in addition to his solo work.

Biography
Dorge started taking drum lessons at age six. His first band consisted of an accordion player and him on drums. His friend moved to bass guitar and they jammed to Black Sabbath. He has been with the Crash Test Dummies since 1991, and has been credited as co-producer for both God Shuffled His Feet and A Worm's Life, the former of which reached sales of almost eight million worldwide.

Since 1999 Dorge has worked with Tuesday's Girl and Charlie Redstar as producer, engineer and drummer. Dorge was awarded the Prairie Music Award for Outstanding Instrumental Recording for his solo record, As Trees Walking. Downsampling Perception, a documentary based on Dorge's motivational and educational program "In Your Face and Interactive", has shown in film festivals worldwide, and has been nominated and awarded for best documentary. His soundtrack work for Cemetery Love Story and Mutual Cadence has reached audiences around the world. He is also a worldwide school presenter; he shares stories of his career and other life lessons.

He also travels to schools to bring a motivational awareness program to people on the topic of drugs and alcohol.

Solo discography

Albums
 As Trees Walking (2002)

References

External links
 
 
 
 
 

Canadian rock drummers
Canadian male drummers
Crash Test Dummies members
1960 births
Living people
Musicians from Winnipeg
Canadian people of Norwegian descent
Canadian record producers
Canadian film score composers
Male film score composers
Canadian television composers
20th-century Canadian drummers